Sparbu is a village in the municipality of Steinkjer in Trøndelag county, Norway. The European route E6 highway runs through the village as does the Nordlandsbanen railway line which stops at the Sparbu Station.

The village was the administrative centre of the old municipality of Sparbu from 1838 until the dissolution of the municipality in 1964.

Notable residents
 Hans Ystgaard (1882–1953) farmer and politician, Mayor of Sparbu
 Peder E. Vorum (1884 in Steinnes – 1970) an educator and politician for the Labour Democrats & Nasjonal Samling
 Kristen Eik-Nes (1922 in Sparbu – 1992) a medical scientist, academic and art collector
 Jarle Benum (born 1928 in Sparbu) a Norwegian politician
 Torgeir Brandtzæg (born 1941) a ski jumper, two bronze medals in the 1964 Winter Olympics then became a farmer in Sparbu
 Mona Juul (born 1959 in Sparbu) a Norwegian Ministry of Foreign Affairs and former politician
 Sigrid Ekran, (Norwegian Wiki) (born 1980 in Sparbu) 11th-place winner of the 2012 Iditarod
 Karl Morten Eek (born 1988 in Sparbu) a Norwegian footballer

References

External links
Sparbu Rail Station

Villages in Trøndelag
Steinkjer